The Manitoulin Dolomite is a geologic formation in Ontario. It preserves fossils dating back to the Silurian period.

See also

 List of fossiliferous stratigraphic units in Ontario

References
 

Silurian Ontario
Silurian System of Europe
Llandovery geology